Elisabeth Tankeu (29 February 1944 – 16 October 2011) was a Cameroonian politician. She was the African Union's
Commissioner of Trade and Industry.

Political career
From 1976 to 1979 Tankeu served as Deputy Director of Planning for Cameroon and from 1980 to 1983 she was Director of the same ministry. From 1983 to 1988 she was Deputy Minister for Planning of Industries and from 1988 to 1992 Minister for Planning and Regional Development.

Personal life
Tankeu died on 16 October 2011 in a Hospital in Paris, France.
She was buried on 19 November 2011 in Bangoua, her husband's native town in West Cameroon.

References

External links
 Elisabeth Tankeu bio

1944 births
2011 deaths
African Union Commission members
Government ministers of Cameroon
Women government ministers of Cameroon